Middle Longhua Road, formerly Chuanchang Road, is an interchange station between Line 7 and Line 12 of the Shanghai Metro located in Xuhui District. During construction it was known as Pujiang Nanpu Station. It began operation on 5 December 2009 with the official name Chuanchang Road station. In December 2012, it was officially renamed Middle Longhua Road Station. Line 12 services started on 19 December 2015, at which point it became an interchange station.

Station Layout 

Railway stations in Shanghai
Line 7, Shanghai Metro
Line 12, Shanghai Metro
Shanghai Metro stations in Xuhui District
Railway stations in China opened in 2009